Bruce Lawrence Taylor (born May 28, 1948) is a former professional American football player who was selected by the San Francisco 49ers in the 1st round of the 1970 NFL Draft. Taylor played in eight National Football League (NFL) seasons and spent his entire career with the 49ers from 1970–1977. With the 49ers, Taylor played at the NFC Championship Game in 1971 and 1972. He also played at the Pro Bowl in 1972. During his football career, Taylor received several rookie of the year awards including ones from Pro Football Weekly and the Associated Press.

In 1978, Taylor was cut from the 49ers and briefly played for the Montreal Alouettes in the Canadian Football League (CFL). With the Alouettes, Taylor played in the Eastern Football Conference and Grey Cup championships held in 1978. Following his cut from the Oakland Raiders in 1979, Taylor worked in finance before becoming a Burger King owner in 1982. After expanding his Burger King locations to 18 stores by the late 1990s, Taylor returned to sports as a volunteer coach for a Florida high school in 2009. Taylor was inducted into the College Football Hall of Fame in 1997.

Early life and education
On May 28, 1948, Taylor was born in Perth Amboy, New Jersey. Growing up, Taylor played baseball and basketball while in high school. After high school, Taylor was picked by the Baltimore Orioles in the 30th round of the 1966 Major League Baseball draft. He declined the offer by the Orioles to attend Boston University. 

During his time at Boston, he played at the 1968 NCAA University Division baseball tournament on the Boston University Terriers team. As a football player, Taylor appeared at the Pasadena Bowl and East–West Shrine Bowl in 1969. He also worked as a schoolteacher and factory worker while attending university.

Career
In 1970, Taylor turned down an offer to play in the Canadian Football League with the Montreal Alouettes. During the first round of the 1970 NFL Draft, Taylor was picked by the San Francisco 49ers. With the 49ers, Taylor appeared at the NFC Championship Game in 1971 and 1972. As part of the National Football Conference, Taylor played at the 1972 Pro Bowl. 

Taylor continued to play with the 49ers until he injured his hamstring in July 1978. After sitting out the 49ers training camp due to injury, Taylor was cut from the team in August 1978. During his eight seasons with the 49ers, Taylor was the 1970 punt returns season leader with 516 yards. Overall, Taylor had 1323 punt return yards and 190 kick return yards during his 109 games in the NFL. He also accumulated 201 yards with his 18 interceptions. 

During his football career, Taylor was employed by Dean Witter Reynolds and began his stockbroking experience. Taylor was a stockbroker upon leaving the 49ers before he joined the Montreal Alouettes in late 1978. As a substitute for injured Dickie Harris, Taylor and the Alouettes defeated the Ottawa Rough Riders at the 1978 Eastern Football Conference championship. While continuing to play as Harris's replacement, Taylor and the Alouettes lost to the Edmonton Eskimos at the 1978 Grey Cup. In May 1979, Taylor returned to the United States and joined a training camp for the Oakland Raiders. He remained with the Raiders for a few months before being cut in August 1979.

In 1979, Taylor stopped playing football and worked in finance for three years. After switching to fast food in 1982, Taylor owned Burger King locations in Seattle and Woodinville, Washington by the early 1990s. By the late 1990s, Taylor had opened Burger King stores in Chicago and owned eighteen locations. Taylor returned to sports in 2009 when he became a high school volunteer coach in Florida.

Honors and personal life
In 1969, Taylor was named the best senior player in New England by the New England Football Writers Association. That year, the Gridiron Club of Boston chose Taylor as the best football player in New England. Taylor and Marty Liquori were each chosen by The New Jersey Sports Writers Association as "New Jersey's outstanding college athlete" in 1970. As a defensive player, Taylor won the 1970 rookie of the year awards from Pro Football Weekly and the Associated Press. 

While a member of the National Football Conference, Taylor received rookie of the year awards for 1970 from the United Press International and Sporting News. For hall of fames, Taylor was named into Boston University Athletic Hall of Fame in 1970 and became part of the College Football Hall of Fame in 1997. Taylor is married and has two children.

References

1948 births
Living people
Sportspeople from Perth Amboy, New Jersey
Perth Amboy High School alumni
American football cornerbacks
American football return specialists
Boston University Terriers football players
Boston University alumni
San Francisco 49ers players
National Conference Pro Bowl players
College Football Hall of Fame inductees
National Football League Defensive Rookie of the Year Award winners
Players of American football from New Jersey
Burger King people